Frank Forsyth (19 December 1905 – 2 May 1984), sometimes credited as Frank Forsythe, was an English actor, active from the 1930s. He was born on 19 December 1905 in London, England. He appeared in several TV programmes, including Department S (1969), The Adventures of Black Beauty (1972) and Journey to the Unknown (1968), as well as numerous films including eight of the Carry On films. He died on 2 May 1984 in Poole, England.

Filmography

Dick Turpin (TV series – episode: "The Godmother") (1980) – Briggs
The Naked Civil Servant (TV film) (1975) – Family Doctor
Love Among the Ruins (TV film) (1975) – Jessop
Craze (1974) – Man at Will Reading (uncredited)
The Carnforth Practice (TV series) (1974) – Jury Foreman
The Adventures of Black Beauty (TV series – episode: "The Challenge") (1973) – Old Tom
Tales That Witness Madness (1973) – Uncle Albert (segment "Penny Farthing")
And Now the Screaming Starts! (1973) – Servant
The Vault of Horror (1973) – Male Customer (segment "Midnight Mess") (uncredited)
Asylum (1972) – Asylum Gatekeeper (segment "Mannikins of Horror") (uncredited)
Tales from the Crypt (1972) – Tramp (segment "Reflection of Death") (uncredited)
Love Story (TV series – episode: "You Don't Know Me, But") (1972) – Commissionaire
Z Cars (TV series – episode: "A Couple of Comic Turns: Part 1") (1970) – Night Porter
Z Cars (TV series – episode: "A Couple of Comic Turns: Part 2") (1970) – Night Porter
Z Cars (TV series – episode: "Contraband") (1962) – Inspector Dave Driver
Carry On Again Doctor (1969) – Mr. Bean (uncredited)
Department S (TV series – episode: "The Last Train to Redbridge") (1969) – Sawyer
Department S (TV series – episode: "A Cellar Full of Silence") (1969) – Norman Fowler
Oh! What a Lovely War (1969) – President Woodrow Wilson (uncredited)
Dracula Has Risen from the Grave (1968) – Villager (uncredited)
Journey to the Unknown (TV series – episode: "Eve" (1968) – Night Watchman
Man in a Suitcase (TV series – episode: "Essay in Evil") (1967) – Lorry Driver
Man in a Suitcase (TV series – episode: "Web with Four Spiders") (1968) – 
Man in a Suitcase (TV series – episode: "Which Way Did He Go, McGill?") (1968) – Steward
They Came from Beyond Space (1967) – Blake
The Terrornauts (1967) – Uncle
The Forsyte Saga (TV series – episode: "Into the Dark") (1967) – Inspector Galloway
The Stable Door (short) (1966) – Nightwatchman
The Deadly Bees (1966) – Doctor
Eye of the Devil (1966) – Guest at Harp Recital (uncredited)
Carry On Screaming! (1966) – Desk Sergeant
Crossroads (TV series – episode: #1.439) (1966) – Mr. Barling
Crossroads (TV series – episode: #1.423) (1966) – Mr. Barling
Crossroads (TV series – episode: #1.252) (1965) – Mr. Charlesworth
The Psychopath (1965) – Tucker
Game for Three Losers (1965) – Jimmy
The Big Job (1965) – Bank Cashier
The Skull (1965) – Judge
The Troubleshooters (TV series – episode: "Young Turk") (1965) – Bajer
Devils of Darkness(1965) – Antique Shop Caretaker
Hysteria (1965) – Man Walking on Embankment (uncredited)
Edgar Wallace Mysteries (film series – episode: "Game for Three Losers") (1965) – Jimmy
Edgar Wallace Mysteries (film series – episode: "Man at the Carlton Tower") (1961) – Commissionaire
Dr. Terror's House of Horrors (1965) – Toastmaster (segment "Disembodied Hand") (uncredited)
Traitor's Gate (1964) – Chief Yeoman Warden
Blind Corner (1964) – Inspector
Carry On Spying (1964) – Professor Stark
The Evil of Frankenstein (1964) – Manservant (uncredited)
Ring of Spies (1964) – Desk Sergeant (uncredited)
Nightmare (1964) – Waiter (uncredited)
Carry On Jack (1964) – Second Sealord
Carry On Cabby (1963) – Chauffeur
Richard the Lionheart (TV series – episode: "The Castle of Prince Otto") (1963) – Herald
Walter and Connie (TV series – episode: "Walter and Connie Selling Books") (1963) – Police Sergeant (as Frank Forsythe)
The Brain (1962) – Francis (uncredited)
The Big Pull (TV series – episode: #1.3) (1962) – Supt. Teale
Twice Round the Daffodils (1962) – Dorothy's Father
Man at the Carlton Tower (1961) – Commissionaire
Touch of Death (1961) – Local inspector
What a Whopper (1961) – 3rd. Scot
Raising the Wind (1961) – Prof. Gerald Abrahams
Our Mister Ambler (TV series – episode: "Camera Obscura")
One Way Pendulum (TV film) (1961) – Usher
Three on a Spree (1961) – Barman
Rag Doll (1961) – Superintendent
Konga (1961) – General (uncredited)
Jackpot (1960) – Desk Sergeant
International Detective (TV series – episode: "The Rainis Case") (1960) – The Immigration Officer
Circle of Deception (1960) – (uncredited)
ITV Play of the Week (TV series – episode: "The Burning Glass") (1960) – Inspector Wigg
The Vise (TV series – episode: "Where There's a Will") (1958) – Surgeon
The Vise (TV series – episode: "Six Months to Talk") (1958) – Doctor
The Vise (TV series – episode: "Full Moon") (1959) – Doctor
The Vise (TV series – episode: "Murder with Make-Up") (1959) – Scientist
The Vise (TV series – episode: "Black Pawn, White Pawn") (1960) – Webster
The Young Jacobites (1960) – Laird
Carry On Constable (1960) – Citizen
No Hiding Place (TV series – episode: "The Final Chase" (1960) – Doctor
No Hiding Place (TV series – episode: "A Genuine Sale of Murder") (1959) – Doctor
No Hiding Place (TV series – episode: "Checkmate") (1959) – Doctor
Glencannon (TV series – episode: "Scot from Scotland Yard") (1959) – The Inspector
The Flying Doctor (TV series – episode: "A Call to London") (1959) – Police Sergeant
Innocent Meeting (1959) – (uncredited)
Horrors of the Black Museum (1959) – Postman (uncredited)
Carry On Nurse (1959) – John Gray
The Solitary Child (1958) – Doctor
Chain of Events (1958) – Johnson
Television Playwright (TV series – episode: "Hour of the Rat") (1958) – Desmond Rogers
Carry On Sergeant (1958) – Second Specialist
Sunday Night Theatre (TV series – episode: "Witch Wood") (1954) – Thomas Spotswood
Sunday Night Theatre (TV series – episode: "Queen Elizabeth Slept Here") (1956) – Clayton Shaw
Sunday Night Theatre (TV series – episode: "The Frog") (1958) – Prison warder
Print of Death (short) (1958) – Ballistics Expert (uncredited)
Dunkirk (1958) – Small Boat Owner (uncredited)
I Accuse! (1958) – Minister at President's Meeting (uncredited)
Legal Action (TV film) (1958) – Police photographer
Man from Tangier (1957) – Sgt. Irons
The Surgeon's Knife (1957) – Anaesthetist
The White Cliffs Mystery (short) (1957) – Forensic Investigator (uncredited)
The Vicious Circle (1957) – Sgt. Wallace (uncredited)
Kind Cousin (TV film) (1957) – Dr. Weston
The Case of 'The Smiling Widow' (short) (1957) – Detective Jarvis (uncredited)
The Man Without a Body (1957) – Detective
The Lonely House (short) (1957) – Inspector Parry (as Frank Forsythe)
Person Unknown (short) (1956) – 2nd Pathologist (uncredited)
Poison Pen (TV film) (1956) – Inspector Davies
Circus Friends (1956) – Police Sergeant
The Battle of the River Plate (1956) – Petty Officer, Bridge,  (uncredited)
Destination Death (short) (1956) – Police Officer (uncredited)
Nom-de-Plume (TV series – episode: "The Free Air") (1956) – Monsieur Vincent (as Frank Forsythe)
Nom-de-Plume (TV series – episode: "A Rough Diamond") (1956) – Doctor (as Frank Forsythe)
The Door in the Wall (short) (1956) – Policeman (uncredited)
Wicked as They Come (1956) – Jeweller (uncredited)
Keep It Clean (1956) – Inspector at Court
Fabian of the Yard (TV series – episode: "The Masterpiece") (1956) – Museum Custodian
Fabian of the Yard (TV series – episode: "Cocktail Girl") (1956) – Museum Custodian
Dial 999 (1955) – Policeman (uncredited)
Stock Car (1955) – Detective Inspector Roberts
No Smoking (1955) – 2nd Minister
Stolen Assignment (1955) – Dr. Roberts
Before I Wake (1955) – Jack Storey
Tiger by the Tail (1954) – Sgt. Gross
The Embezzler (1954) – Inspector Gale (as Frank Forsythe)
The Scarlet Web (1954) – Jeweller (uncredited)
Rheingold Theatre (TV series – episode: "Myra and the Moneyman") (1954) – First Gendarme
The Diamond (1954) – P.C. with Taxi Driver (uncredited)
Late Night Final (short) (1954) – Constable Everitt
Double Exposure (1954) – Inspector Grayle (as Frank Forsythe)
Escape by Night (1953) – Reporter (uncredited)
The Silent Witness (short) (1953) – Detective Forbes
13 East Street (1952) – Prison Officer (uncredited)
The Lavender Hill Mob (1951) – Minor Role (uncredited)
Pool of London (1951) – Police Constable Witnessing Robbery (uncredited)
Midnight Episode (1950) – Police Officer (uncredited)
Treasures in Heaven (TV film) (1950) – Sid, the Barman
The Case of Charles Peace (1949) – Police Training Instructor (uncredited)
Kid Flanagan (TV film) (1948) – Chris Richards (as Frank Forsythe)
The Dark Road (1948) – Detective
The Middle Watch (TV film) (1948) – Corporal Duckett, RM (as Frank Forsythe)
Goofer Trouble (short) (1940) – Black
Dusty Ermine (1936) – Radio Operator (uncredited)
The Good Companions (1933)

References

External links

1905 births
1984 deaths
20th-century English male actors
English male film actors
English male television actors
Male actors from London